Admiral  Ravindra Chandrasiri Wijegunaratne, WV, RWP & Bar, RSP, VSV, USP, NI(M), ndc, psn,  is a retired Sri Lankan naval officer, and former Chief of Defence Staff of the Sri Lanka Armed Forces. He  has also served as the Commander of the Sri Lankan Navy, Chief of Staff of the Sri Lanka Navy, the Director General of the Sri Lanka Coast Guard and held, at various times, four of the seven Naval Commands of the SLN. Wijegunaratne has also served as Director Naval Operations, and is a recipient of the Weerodara Vibhushanaya.

Education
Born in 1962, Wijegunaratne was educated at the Royal College, Colombo from 1969. At Royal College, he was a President's Scout, Lance sergeant of the Herman Loos Cadet Platoon and a School Prefect in addition to representing the school in both hockey and basketball, as well as being an All-Island Junior Athletics Champion. He was the fourth Royalist to be appointed Commander of the SLN.

Graduating in the same year, he enlisted in the Sri Lanka Navy on 1 November 1980 as an officer cadet as part of the 9th Intake at the  Naval and Maritime Academy, Trincomalee. He completed officer training as a Midshipman at both Trincomalee and Dartmouth (where he was awarded 'Best International Midshipman, 1982') in 1982. He would go on to follow a Sub-lieutenant technical course and specialize in anti-submarine warfare in India, and followed a staff course at the Pakistan Navy War College. In 1996 he gained a BSc in War Studies from the University of Karachi, and later graduated from the National Defense University (NESA) and National Defence College, India (50th NDC Course - 2010). In 2010, he obtained an MPhil in Defence and Strategic Studies at the University of Madras. He is a Member of the Nautical Institute.

Naval career
Starting out as a Sub-lieutenant, Admiral Wijegunaratne gained early exposure to the Sri Lankan Civil War fighting alongside India's MARCOS in the Indian Peace Keeping Force's 1987 Operation Pawan. Having been promoted to the rank of Lieutenant Commander, he founded Sri Lanka's elite Special Boat Squadron (SBS) in 1993, building on the work done by Lieutenant commander Shanthi Bahar. Wijegunaratne led the SBS during the Battle of Pooneryn and held its command twice through his career, once in 1993-1994 and again in 1999-2000. As a result of his specialization and work in the SBS, he is regarded as an expert in asymmetric naval warfare and small boat operations. Between June 2005 and March 2006, he served as Commanding Officer of the SLN's flagship at that time, SLNS Sayura. He was also instrumental in forming the Sri Lanka Navy Marines.

Promoted to the rank of Commodore, and then to Rear Admiral in 2009, Wijegunaratne has held several appointments and commands within the Sri Lanka Navy:
Director Naval Operations
Director Naval Weapon Systems
Director Special Forces
Director Maritime Surveillance
Commandant of the Naval and Maritime Academy
Flag officer Commanding Naval Fleet
Director General Services
Commander, Eastern Naval Command
Commander, Northern Naval Command
Commander, Western Naval Command
Commander, Southern Naval Command
As Director Naval Operations in 2007, he oversaw the SLN's efforts to halt Sea Tiger arms smuggling, leading to the destruction of what are thought to be the LTTE's four final floating armouries.

He was appointed the Chief of Staff of the Sri Lanka Navy on 7 July 2014, and promoted to Vice Admiral and appointed Commander of the Navy on 11 July 2015. On 22 February 2016, President Maithripala Sirisena granted him a six-month service extension as commander.

On 18 August 2017, Wijegunaratne was promoted to the rank of Admiral  and appointed Chief of Defense Staff in light of his upcoming retirement from active service. He assumed duties as CDS on 22 August 2017.

Wijegunaratne has also held a diplomatic post as First Secretary and Defense Attaché at the Sri Lankan High Commission in New Delhi between 2001 and 2005. He has been a guest lecturer at the Center for Irregular Warfare and Armed Groups, US Naval War College and the Pakistan Navy War College.

Honors 
His decorations include Weerodara Vibhushanaya, Rana Wickrama Padakkama twice, Rana Sura Padakkama for gallantry; Vishista Seva Vibhushanaya and Uttama Seva Padakkama for meritorious service, and the Surface Warfare Badge.

On 13 February 2019, Admiral Wijegunaratne was awarded the Nishan-e-Imtiaz (Military) Medal by the President of Pakistan in Islamabad.

Personal life
Wijegunaratne is married to Yamuna De Saram and has one son, Satyajith. He has been a keen sportsman since his childhood, and is a qualified diver and parachutist; a parachuting accident in 2001 led to Wijegunaratne breaking both legs. In addition to playing hockey and basketball at school, he has represented the SLN in rugby, and rowing/sailing, both of which he has received Sri Lanka Navy Colours for. He is an expert marksman, and has held the Chair of the Sri Lanka Rifle Association and the Sri Lanka Navy Golf Club.

Controversy
Wijegunaratne was alleged to have threatened and assaulted a journalist during an SLN intervention during a violent dockworkers' strike at the Hambantota Port in December 2016

Honors
He was awarded the Nishan-e-Imtiaz the highest of civil honor given by the Government of Pakistan in 2019.

See also
Sri Lanka Navy
Special Boat Squadron (Sri Lanka)

References

Commanders of the Navy (Sri Lanka)
Sri Lankan admirals
Sinhalese military personnel
Sri Lankan male divers
Sri Lankan military attachés
Special Boat Squadron (Sri Lanka) officers
Alumni of Royal College, Colombo
Naval and Maritime Academy graduates
Graduates of Britannia Royal Naval College
National Defense University alumni
National Defence College, India alumni
University of Madras alumni
University of Karachi alumni
Recipients of Nishan-e-Imtiaz
Living people
1962 births
Indian Peace Keeping Force